Batrachedra sterilis is a species of moth of the family Batrachedridae. It is found in Australia.

Original description

External links
Australian Faunal Directory

Batrachedridae
Moths of Australia
Moths described in 1897
Taxa named by Edward Meyrick